Francis "Frank" Gailey (21 January 1882 – 10 July 1972) was an Australian-born American competition swimmer who swam in the 1904 Summer Olympics held in St. Louis, Missouri.

Gailey was born in Brisbane, Queensland, Australia, but later emigrated to the United States and became a naturalized U.S. citizen in 1906.  For the 1904 Olympics, he was sponsored by the Olympic Club of San Francisco.  The International Olympic Committee (IOC) officially counts Gailey's four medals for the United States, although research undertaken by several Australian newspapers in 2008–09 showed that Gailey was an Australian citizen at the time. In 2009, the Australian Olympic Committee stated that "Gailey's medals, newly credited to Australia, increase the nation's total at summer Olympics to 449".

At the 1904 Summer Olympics, Gailey competed in four swimming events, and due to the lack of entrants all the events were straight finals, on 6 September he entered the 220 yard freestyle, where he finished just under two seconds behind American Charles Daniels and gained a silver medal, on the same day he also entered the 1 mile freestyle and after swimming for nearly 29 minutes he finished in third place behind German Emil Rausch and Hungarian Géza Kiss. The next day Gailey competed in his other two events the 440 yard freestyle, where again he finished second to Charles Daniels, and then the German Emil Rausch beat him in the 880 yard freestyle, so in his two days of events he finished with 3 silver medals and one bronze.

See also
 List of Olympic medalists in swimming (men)

References

External links
Frank Gailey – Olympic athlete profile databaseOlympics.com

1882 births
1972 deaths
American male freestyle swimmers
Australian male freestyle swimmers
Australian emigrants to the United States
Olympic bronze medalists for the United States in swimming
Olympic silver medalists for the United States in swimming
Olympic swimmers of Australia
Swimmers from Brisbane
Swimmers at the 1904 Summer Olympics
Medalists at the 1904 Summer Olympics